Dolinasorex glyphodon was a species of giant venomous shrew that is now extinct. Remains of the animal were found at the Gran Dolina site, located in the Sierra de Atapuerca, Burgos, Spain by researchers from the University of Zaragoza, Spain between 1991 and 2007. The deposit is estimated to be between 780,000 and 900,000 years old. D. glyphodon was the only species in the genus Dolinasorex.

References

Red-toothed shrews
Pleistocene mammals
Prehistoric mammals of Europe